H. F. Lowe (full name and dates unknown) was an English cricketer who played for Hampshire.

Lowe made a single first-class appearance for the team, against Sussex in 1882. Batting in the lower order, Lowe scored a duck in the first innings of the match and did not bat in the second.

External links
H. F. Lowe at CricketArchive

English cricketers
Hampshire cricketers
Year of birth unknown
Year of death unknown